Barlin is a commune in the Pas-de-Calais department in the Hauts-de-France region in northern France.

Geography

History
Barlin dates to at least 1141, the year of the first mention of the parish of Barlin in a manuscript now kept in the National Archives. It was then spelt Ballin or Bellin. The name changed several times over the centuries, being recorded as Ballin in 1141, Bellin in 1438 and Barlaing in 1556; it was not until the next century that it became Barlin.

In the 12th century, the territory of Barlin was divided into several lordships that depended on Saint-Pol-sur-Ternoise, Arras or Béthune. In 1207, Thomas Hasbare was seigneur of Barlin. The Melun family succeeded him and one of their lords, nicknamed Le Brun, the king's chamberlain, saw his property confiscated by Duke John the Fearless, who had accused him of allegiance with his enemies. The Duke of Burgundy then donated the land and income of Barlin to Walleran de Juhaucourt.

In the mid-nineteenth century, coalmining began at Barlin, and the town flourished. Its mines closed in the 1960s.

Today, Barlin is a modern and dynamic place that offers its residents numerous amenities: schools, colleges, a swimming pool, a library and sports halls.

Population

Sights
The church of St. Pierre, dating from the eighteenth century
The Commonwealth War Graves Commission cemetery
The museum

See also
Communes of the Pas-de-Calais department

References

External links

Barlin official website 
Barlin schools' website 
The CWGC communal cemetery extension at Barlin

Communes of Pas-de-Calais